Michael Morales (born April 25, 1963) is an American musician most known for the Top 40-charting songs, "Who Do You Give Your Love To?", (No. 15 Billboard Hot 100), and a cover version of The Romantics "What I Like About You", (No. 28 Billboard Hot 100).

Early life
Born in San Antonio, Texas and he came from a musical family, (his father, Henry met his mother, Felicia when the two were to perform together on a radio broadcast). As a child, Morales formed and played guitar, drums and piano in several bands including Crimson Sash. In 1980, he founded the popular band, The Max, in which he would perform until signing his first recording contract with PolyGram Records in 1988.

Career
Morales’ debut album, the self-titled Michael Morales, was released by Polygram in 1989. It garnered MTV airplay and landed three hit singles on the Billboard Hot 100 chart, including "Who Do You Give Your Love To?", (peaked No. 15 Billboard Hot 100). Before releasing his second album on PolyGram, Thump (1991), he founded Studio M in San Antonio. There he and brother, Ron Morales, have won four Grammy awards for records produced and recorded at Studio M. In 2000, Morales released his third CD on Major/MTM Records entitled That's The Way.

Aside from chart success, Morales's music can be heard in a number of feature films, including the 2000 Woody Allen film, Picking Up the Pieces, and the Cannes Film Festival winner, The Three Burials of Melquiades Estrada, from 2005.

Morales has also worked with several big names such as Beyoncé, Def Leppard, Selena, Cee Lo Green, and more.

To date, Morales's works have been nominated for six Grammy Awards and has won four of them.

Current life
Morales resides in San Antonio with his wife and two children. His other brother is former Texas state attorney general, Dan Morales. He has his own music lesson business in San Antonio, called the Michael Morales Rockstar Academy and Rock Music Institute.

Discography

Studio albums
 1989: Michael Morales
 1991: Thump
 1999: That's the Way

Singles

References

External links
 www.studioMus.com
 www.moralesacademy.com

1963 births
Living people
Record producers from Texas
Singer-songwriters from Texas
American male singer-songwriters
American people of Latin American descent